Charles "Charly" Hertig (22 October 1939 – 6 August 2012) was a Swiss footballer and manager who played as a centre-back or midfielder and made five appearances for the Switzerland national team.

Club career
Hertig was part of the Lausanne-Sport team, one of the greatest in the club's history, which would be nicknamed the "Lords of the Night", as they played and shone particularly at night while most other teams played Sunday afternoon. The team was coached by Austrian Karl Rappan, and included Richard Dürr, André Grobéty, Heinz Schneiter and Ely Tacchella. The team won two Swiss Cup titles in 1962 and 1964, before winning the 1964–65 Nationalliga A, the club's seventh and most recent national championship title.

International career
Hertig made his debut for Switzerland on 11 November 1962 in a 1964 European Nations' Cup qualifying match against the Netherlands, scoring the only goal for Switzerland in the 1–3 loss. He went on to make five appearances, scoring one goal, before making his last appearance on 22 October 1966 in a friendly match against Belgium, which finished as a 0–1 loss.

Managerial career
Hertig began his managerial career at Yverdon Sport from 1972 to 1973, before returning to Lausanne-Sport as manager in 1979. He remained coach at Lausanne until 1982, winning the Swiss Cup in 1981.

Career statistics

International

International goals

Honours

Player
Lausanne-Sport
 Nationalliga A: 1964–65
 Swiss Cup: 1961–62, 1963–64

Manager
Lausanne-Sport
 Swiss Cup: 1980–81

References

External links
 
 
 

1939 births
2012 deaths
Swiss men's footballers
Swiss football managers
Switzerland international footballers
Association football central defenders
Association football midfielders
Servette FC players
FC Lausanne-Sport players
BSC Young Boys players
FC Monthey players
Swiss Super League players
Yverdon-Sport FC managers
FC Lausanne-Sport managers